The University of San Pedro Sula USAP (Universidad de San Pedro Sula, or better known as "La U Privada" [The Private College])  was founded in 1977 by the initiative of the Sociedad Promotora Educativa, S.A. de C.V and authorized by a governmental executive order on August 21, 1978.
Its campus is located in the city of San Pedro Sula, Honduras.

Promoters of this first initiative in private higher education in Honduras was a group of persons representing the business, professional, and cultural sectors of San Pedro Sula, led by Mr. Jorge Emilio Jaar, father of  Ricardo Jaar, current Executive President of the university.

Majors 

Initially, they offered two majors: 
 Business Administration (Administración de Empresas)
 Law (Derecho)
In the following years, they introduced 
 Arquitectura
 Ingeniería en Operaciones y Logística
 Ingeniería Industrial
 Ingeniería Agronómica Administrativa
 Ingeniería en Tecnologías Computacionales
 Licenciatura en Diseño Gráfico, Técnico en Diseño Gráfico
 Facultad de Ciencias Económico Administrativas
 Licenciatura en Negocios Electrónicos
 Licenciatura en Administración Financiera y Bancaria
 Técnico en Administración de la Producción
 Licenciatura en Mercadotecnia
 Técnico en Administración de Ventas
 Licenciatura en Ciencias de la Comunicación y Publicidad
 Licenciatura en Administración Turística
 Técnico en Administración Turística
 Licenciatura en Informática Administrativa
 Maestría en Administración de Empresas
 Maestría en Administración Industrial and Maestría en Derecho Procesal Civil.
In total, the university offers twenty-one majors.
In the university's first year there were only a dozen professors throughout the disciplines. Today, there are more than 200.

In 2007 Universidad de San Pedro Sula together with Fundacion Educar, commenced the development of an educational media project to benefit the entire community  in Central America, as well as the television and broadcasting industry in the region. Campus TV was inaugurated in November 2008.

Campus 

The Campus is located on the north-west part of the city of San Pedro Sula, Cortés. Its extension covers twelve blocks.

References

University of San Pedro Sula
Educational institutions established in 1977
1977 establishments in Honduras